In Sinhala Buddhist beliefs the Ayyanayake is a  village guardian deity similar in many respects to Aiyyanar of the Tamil people. He is usually depicted with a huge horse statue.

References

Sinhalese Buddhist deities